Cadillacs and Dinosaurs may refer to:

Cadillacs and Dinosaurs or Xenozoic Tales, a 1987–1996 alternative comic book by Mark Schultz
Cadillacs and Dinosaurs (role-playing game), produced in 1990 by GDW Games
Cadillacs and Dinosaurs (arcade game), a 1993 arcade game
Cadillacs and Dinosaurs (TV series), a 1993 animated television series
Cadillacs and Dinosaurs: The Second Cataclysm, a 1994 console and computer game